Sukumaran is an Indian surname.

People with that name: 
 Ambika Sukumaran, Indian film actress in Malayalam films during the 1960s and 1970s
 Ashok Sukumaran, Japanese-born contemporary artist
 G. Sukumaran Nair, General Secretary of Nair Service Society
 Indrajith (born Indrajith Sukumaran on 17 December 1979), Indian film actor
 K. Sukumaran (journalist) (8 January 1903 - 18 September 1981), Editor of Kerala Kaumudi Daily
 K. Sukumaran (judge), former judge in the high courts of Kerala and Mumbai
 K. Sukumaran (writer) (20 May 1876 - 11 March 1956), short story writer and humourist
 M. Sukumaran (born 1943), author and short story writer in Malayalam
 Mallika Sukumaran, television actress in India
 Myuran Sukumaran, an Australian who was executed in Indonesia on 29 April 2015; he was one of the Bali 9.
 N. K. Sukumaran Nair (born 6 June 1942), environmental activist
 P. Sukumaran Nair, Indian film actor and producer
 Prithviraj Sukumaran (born 16 October 1982), an Indian film actor and producer
 R. Sukumaran, Indian film director
 T. K. Sukumaran, Indian cricketer
 Tatapuram Sukumaran (22 October 1923 – 26 October 1988), Malayalam writer
 Thikkurissy Sukumaran Nair, Malayali Indian poet, playwright, script writer, lyricist, orator, film director and actor
 Vinod Sukumaran, Indian filmmaker

Indian surnames